William Andrew "Pug" Pearman (May 1, 1929 – December 19, 2004) was an American football player. A native of North Carolina, Pearman attended the University of Tennessee where he played at the tackle position for the Tennessee Volunteers football team.  He was a member of the national championship 1951 Tennessee team and was selected by the Associated Press, the Football Writers Association of America, and the Newspaper Enterprise Association as a first-team player on their 1951 College Football All-America Teams. After graduating from Tennessee, Pearman served in the U.S. Army Corps of Engineers from 1952 to 1954. He was thereafter employed until 1970 by Exxon and later by Vol Oil Company and in the 1980s by Browning-Ferris Industries.

References

1929 births
2004 deaths
American football tackles
Tennessee Volunteers football players
Players of American football from Charlotte, North Carolina